is a former Japanese football player.

Playing career
Sakamoto was born in Kyoto on January 12, 1974. After graduating from Doshisha University, he joined newly was promoted to J1 League club, Kyoto Purple Sanga based in his local in 1996. He played as defensive midfielder. In 1997, he moved to Regional Leagues club Sagawa Express Osaka. In 2000, he moved to Japan Football League club FC Kyoken (later FC Kyoken Kyoto, FC Kyoto Bamb) based in his local. He played many matches in 3 seasons and retired end of 2002 season.

Club statistics

References

External links

kyotosangadc

1974 births
Living people
Doshisha University alumni
Association football people from Kyoto Prefecture
Japanese footballers
J1 League players
Japan Football League players
Kyoto Sanga FC players
Ococias Kyoto AC players
Association football midfielders